FILM.UA Group is the largest vertically integrated group of companies in the field of film and television production in Eastern Europe. The film studio was established in November 2002. It is the largest producer of film productions in Ukraine.

See also 
The Stolen Princess
The Sniffer

References 

Companies established in 2002
Ukrainian film studios
Companies based in Kyiv
Ukrainian animation studios